Thamee Shin is a 2000 Burmese drama film, directed by Khin Maung Oo & Soe Thein Htut starring Yan Aung, Dwe, Eaindra Kyaw Zin and Khin Than Nu. Khin Than Nu won the Best Supporting Actress Award in 2000 Myanmar Motion Picture Academy Awards.

Cast
Yan Aung as Kyi Thar
Dwe as Kaung Htet
Khin Than Nu as Daw Mi Mi Latt
Eaindra Kyaw Zin as Nge Nge Htun Kyaw
Cho Pyone as Mother of Kaung Htet
Myo Thandar Htun as May Mi Htun Kyaw
Wyne as Min Lwin
Soe Moe Kyi as Devi Htun Kyaw
Sai Bo Bo as Wai Lwin

Awards

References

2000 films
2000s Burmese-language films
Burmese drama films
Films shot in Myanmar
2000 drama films